Kavaközü is a village in Mut district of Mersin Province, Turkey. Population of Kavaközü was 90 as of 2012.

References

Villages in Mut District